Residence Inn by Marriott is a brand of extended stay hotels.  , there were 874 Residence Inn hotels in the United States, Canada and Mexico with 107,680 rooms, plus an additional 243 hotels with 30,417 rooms in the development pipeline. The brand's slogan is "It's not a room. It's a Residence". It was the first extended-stay brand in the United States and was a key player in launching the concept of a "suite" in a hotel.

History
The chain traces its roots back to in 1975, when Wichita, Kansas developer Jack DeBoer found himself with apartment properties that were facing unusually high vacancy rates. He repurposed one of the apartment buildings, converting the residential units to monthly rentals, and named it The Residence. In 1981, DeBoer and developer Robert L. Brock (then the largest franchisee of Holiday Inn), formed a joint venture, launching a chain called The Residence Inn. The hotels focused on the "extended-stay" market, a term they invented. The hotels were aimed at guests staying five nights or more, who would not need conventional daily hotel maid service, which reduced operational costs. Their guests were mostly business travelers on lengthy work assignments, patients of nearby hospitals, and those in need of temporary housing. In January 1985, Holiday Corporation, the parent company of Holiday Inn, bought a 50% stake in The Residence Inn chain. In early 1987, DeBoer bought back Holiday's interest in the chain, before selling the entire company to  Marriott International on July 7, 1987.

Historically, the usual appearance of a Residence Inn was a main building, called the "Gatehouse," which houses the front desk, a common area for meal service, an on-site coin-operated laundry, a swimming pool and exercise room and often several outbuildings similar to condo or apartment complexes. Most had exterior corridors. More recent constructions, however, have moved away from the outbuilding style and instead have a more traditional layout with all suites in the same building. The suites are much larger than traditional hotel rooms, however. They are typically around 450 square feet for a standard suite and 750 for a two-bedroom suite. Residence Inns typically feature a complimentary small hot breakfast in the morning and a complimentary reception on Monday through Wednesday evenings called "The Mix".

Although DeBoer died in 2021, the original Wichita property is still operated by his company, under the WaterWalk brand. The first Residence Inn to be opened by Marriott was in Charlotte, North Carolina. 

In contrast to Marriott's other extended-stay brand, the low-cost TownePlace Suites, Residence Inn competes in the upscale industry segment, along with InterContinental's Staybridge Suites, Hyatt House, and Homewood Suites by Hilton.

Accommodations

Historical

From 2015

Gallery

References

External links
 
 Locations

Extended stay hotel chains
Marriott International brands
Hotels established in 1975
1975 establishments in Kansas
Controversies in the United States